Texas Manhunt, also known as Red Desert, is a 1949 American Western film directed by Ford Beebe and starring Don "Red" Barry and Tom Neal.

Cast
Don Barry as Pecos Jones
Tom Neal as John Williams
Jack Holt as Deacon Smith
Margia Dean as Hazel Carter
Joseph Crehan as President Ulysses S. Grant
Byron Foulger as Sparky Jackson, also known as Lefty Jordan
John Cason as Bob Horn
Tom London as Col. McMasters
Holly Bane as Barton

Producer
The film stars Margia Dean, who recalled "Don Barry was very nice, pleasant and polite to me. But, he was short. And that can create something of a problem. Tom Neal was in it, and I found him to be the serious, brooding type." She says Holt was in the film because producer Robert L Lippert "was good about using once-big names who were a little past their prime!... It was my first leading lady, but still a thankless part. You go in early in the morning for hair and makeup; then are driven a long ways to a dusty, hot, sticky location. At dusk, they take the leading lady's close-up—just when she's grimy! (Laughs) Those tight corsets and five pounds of wigs were all uncomfortable—as were those stagecoach rides—which were so bumpy! (Laughs)".

References

External links

1949 films
American Western (genre) films
Films directed by Ford Beebe
1949 Western (genre) films
Lippert Pictures films
American black-and-white films
1940s English-language films
1940s American films